"So Happy It Hurts" is a song recorded by Bryan Adams. It was first released on October 11, 2021 as the lead single from So Happy It Hurts. This song was nominated for the 2023 Grammy Awards in the Best Rock Performance category.

Background
During the early days of the COVID-19 lockdowns, Adams announced via his social media, that he was working on new songs for his 15th album. The song talks about the return to normalcy after such a surreal time in the heights of the COVID-19 pandemic.

Music video
The song and video are a tribute to the people who experienced distancing during the COVID-19 pandemic. The video was made at The Warehouse Studio in Vancouver. The Adams-directed video, shot in a 1966 Chevrolet Corvair convertible, also features Adams' 93-year-old mother Jane Clark.

Credits and personnel

Song 
 Bryan Adams — lead and backing vocals, drums, hammond organ, percussion, guitars, bass, songwriter, producer
 Keith Scott — guitar
 Gretchen Peters — songwriter
 Hayden Watson — recording engineer
 Olle Romo — recording engineer
 Emily Lazar — recording engineer
 Chris Allgood — recording engineer

Video 
 Bryan Adams — director

Charts

References

2021 singles
2021 songs
Bryan Adams songs
Songs written by Bryan Adams
BMG Rights Management singles
Songs about the COVID-19 pandemic
Songs written by Gretchen Peters
Songs written by Robert John "Mutt" Lange